Senator Dunn may refer to:

Aubrey Dunn Sr. (1928–2012), New Mexico State Senate
Cathy Dunn (born 1949), North Carolina State Senate
Charles J. Dunn (1799–1872), Wisconsin State Senate
David Dunn (Maine politician) (1811–1894), Maine State Senate
George Grundy Dunn (1812–1857), Indiana State Senate
Howard H. Dunn (1867–1942), Minnesota State Senate
James B. Dunn (1927–2016), South Dakota State Senate
Joe Dunn (California politician) (born 1958), California State Senate
Martin J. Dunn (1956–2020), Massachusetts State Senate
Priscilla Dunn (born 1943), Alabama State Senate
Ralph A. Dunn (1914–2004), Illinois State Senate
Richard Dunn (politician) (1905–1988), Maine State Senate
Robert C. Dunn (1855–1918), Minnesota State Senate
Robert G. Dunn (1923–2017), Minnesota State Senate
Thomas A. Dunn (born 1942), Illinois State Senate
Thomas B. Dunn (1853–1924), New York State Senate
Thomas G. Dunn (1921–1998), New Jersey State Senate

See also
Senator Dunne (disambiguation)